Spann Watson (August 14, 1916 – April 15, 2010) was an American military aviator and civil servant who served with the Tuskegee Airmen during World War II. He flew over 30 missions in North Africa, Italy and Southern Europe. On March 2007, Watson attended a ceremony in the U.S. Capitol rotunda, where he and other surviving veterans of the Tuskegee Airmen (and their widows) were honored with the Congressional Gold Medal in recognition of their service. He died on April 15, 2010, aged 93.

Watson was among the first African American U.S. military pilots to engage in aerial combat against an enemy combatant, sharing this achievement with 99th Fighter Squadron pilots Sidney P. Brooks, Charles W. Dryden, Leon C. Roberts, Lee Rayford and Willie Ashley.

Biography

Early life
Watson spent his early life on the family farm outside Johnston, South Carolina. In 1927, the family moved north to Lodi, New Jersey, where he completed his primary education and attended Hackensack High School. In 1937, he enrolled at Howard University as a Mechanical Engineering student and earned a private pilot's license.

Military service

Watson enlisted as a Flying Cadet in November 1941. Completing pilot training at a segregated Tuskegee Army Air Field, in Tuskegee, Alabama in 1942, he became an original member of the 99th Fighter Squadron, the first group of Tuskegee Airmen to fight in World War II and the forerunner of the 332nd Fighter Group.
 
In April 1943, he was among the first 27 pilots (classes 42C – 42H) of the 99th Fighter Squadron commanded by then Lt Col Benjamin O. Davis, Jr., deployed to Casablanca.  On June 9, 1943, as a member of a flight of six P-40s, led by 1st Lt Charles Dryden, he participated in World War II's first aerial combat engagement between black Americans and the Luftwaffe. He flew combat missions with the 99th, flying P-40's from North Africa, Sicily and the Italian mainland. Returning to the United States as an instructor pilot in the newly formed 332nd Fighter Group, he flew the P-39, P-47, P-51 and B-25 at Selfridge Field, Michigan, Walterboro AAF, South Carolina, Godman Field, Kentucky, Freeman Field, Indiana and Lockbourne AFB, Ohio. While at Freeman Field, he participated in the "Freeman Field Mutiny" against segregated base facilities. After the war, he served as the 99th's Operations Officer until the 332nd was disbanded with the integration of the Air Force in 1949. Later assignments included Manager, Air Traffic Control Facilities, Hawaii and Chief Controller for Air Defense Control Centers in Long Island, New York, Misawa, Japan and Taipei, Taiwan. In 1962, he became Director, Air Defense Center, Stewart Air Force Base in Newburgh, New York, and in 1963, Team Leader, Regional Air Inspector General's Office, Northeast, also at Stewart.

Spann's Air Force career lasted over 23 years, during which he qualified as a Command Pilot and accumulated over 5000 flight hours. He retired from active duty as a Lieutenant Colonel on December 1, 1964.

Civilian aviation career
In 1965, he began a 27-year civilian career with the Federal Aviation Administration (FAA), initially serving as an Equal Opportunity Specialist and later as a Senior Air Traffic Specialist and Military Air Traffic Liaison. During his time at FAA, he mentored military and civilian aviation professionals and assisted more than 30 African-Americans who went on to attain appointments to Annapolis, West Point or the Air Force Academy. He retired from the FAA on August 3, 1992.

Tuskegee Airmen, Inc.
He was a founding member and two-term president of the Tuskegee Airmen Incorporated, and a signatory of its Articles of Incorporation.

Honors and awards
Air Defense Medal
Distinguished Service Medal
Air Medal with 2 Oak Leaf Clusters
Army Commendation Medal
Congressional Gold Medal awarded to the Tuskegee Airmen in 2006
Legion of Merit

See also
 Dogfights (TV series)
 Executive Order 9981
 List of Tuskegee Airmen
 Military history of African Americans
 The Tuskegee Airmen (movie)

References

Notes

External links
 Fly (2009 play about the 332d Fighter Group)
Tuskegee Airmen at Tuskegee University
 Tuskegee Airmen Archives at the University of California, Riverside Libraries.
 Tuskegee Airmen, Inc.
 Tuskegee Airmen National Historic Site (U.S. National Park Service) 
 Tuskegee Airmen National Museum

Tuskegee Airmen
Hackensack High School alumni
People from Lodi, New Jersey
People from Johnston, South Carolina
1916 births
2010 deaths
United States Army Air Forces officers
Recipients of the Legion of Merit
Recipients of the Air Medal
African-American aviators
Burials at Arlington National Cemetery
21st-century African-American people
Military personnel from New Jersey